A reimiro is a crescent-shaped pectoral ornament once worn by the people of Easter Island. Thus the crescent represents a Polynesian canoe.

Each side of the reimiro ended in a human face. The outer, display side had two small pierced bumps through which a cord was strung for hanging it. The inner side contained a cavity that was filled with chalk made from powdered seashells.

A reimiro provides the image of the Flag of Rapa Nui (Easter Island). It also appears to feature in the rongorongo script of Easter Island, and one reimiro is preserved with a long rongorongo text.

Although the human faces on the reimiro are unique to Easter Island, the pectoral itself is part of a wider tradition. In the Solomon Islands, for example, women wear shell pectorals which resemble reimiro.

Gallery

References
 Stéphen-Charles Chauvet. 1935. L'île de Pâques et ses mystères ("Easter Island and its Mysteries"). Paris: Éditions Tel. (An online English version is available www.chauvet-translation.com here.)

External links

Splendid Isolation: Art of Easter Island, an exhibition catalog from The Metropolitan Museum of Art (fully available online as PDF), which contains material on Reimiro
A reimiro at the Indiana University Art Museum

Footnotes  

Fashion accessories
Easter Island